Merle Collins (born 29 September 1950 in Aruba) is a distinguished Grenadian poet and short story writer.

Life
Collins' parents are from Grenada, where they returned from Aruba shortly after her birth. Her primary education was in St George's, Grenada. She later studied at the University of the West Indies in Mona, Jamaica, earning degrees in English and Spanish in 1972. She then taught history and Spanish in Grenada for two years and subsequently in St Lucia. 
In 1980, she graduated from Georgetown University, Washington, DC, with a master's degree in Latin American Studies. She graduated from the London School of Economics with a Ph.D. in Government.

Collins was deeply involved in the Grenadian Revolution and served as a government coordinator for research on Latin America and the Caribbean. She left Grenada for England in 1983.

Academic work

From 1984 to 1995, Collins taught at the University of North London. She is currently a Professor of Comparative Literature and English at the University of Maryland, where she was selected as 2018–2019 Distinguished Scholar Teacher.

Her critical works include "Themes and Trends in Caribbean Writing Today" in From My Guy to Sci-Fi: Genre and Women's Writing in the Postmodern World (ed. Helen Carr, Pandora Press, 1989), and "To be Free is Very Sweet" in Slavery and Abolition (Vol. 15, issue 3, 1994, pp. 96–103).

Creative writing

Her first collection of poetry, Because the Dawn Breaks, was published by Karia Press in London in 1985, at which time Collins was a member of African Dawn, a performance group combining poetry, mime, and African music. 

In England, she began her first novel, Angel, which was published in 1987. Angel follows the lives of Grenadians as they struggled for independence, and is specifically about a young woman going through the political turbulence in Grenada at the time. 

Her collection of short stories, Rain Darling, was produced in 1990, and a second collection of poetry, Rotten Pomerack, in 1992. Her second novel, The Colour of Forgetting, was published in 1995. A review of her 2003 poetry collection, Lady in a Boat, states: "Ranging from poems reveling in the nation language of her island to poems that capture the beauty of its flora, Collins presents her island and people going about the business of living. They attempt to come to terms with the past and construct a future emerging out of the crucible of violence. Lady in a Boat is a poignant retelling of a period in history when, for a brief moment, Caribbean ascendancy seemed possible. Merle Collins shows how the death of this moment continues to haunt the Caribbean imagination." Her most recent collection of stories, The Ladies Are Upstairs, was published in 2011.

Bibliography

Poetry
Because the Dawn Breaks, Karia Press, 1985,  
Rotten Pomerack, Virago Press, 1992,  
Lady in a Boat, Peepal Tree Press, 2003,

Novels
 Angel, Women's Press, 1987, ; Seal Press, 1998,  
The Colour of Forgetting, Virago Press, 1995,

Short stories
 Rain Darling, Women's Press, 1990, 
The Ladies are Upstairs, Peepal Tree Press, 2011,

References

External links
Betty Wilson, "An Interview With Merle Collins", Callaloo, Vol. 16, No. 1 (Winter, 1993), pp. 94–107.
Thorunn Lonsdale, "Merle Collins - b. 1950", Journal of the Short Story in English, pp. 299–301.
Jacqueline Bishop and Dolace Nicole McLean, "Working out Grenada: An Interview with Merle Collins", Calabash: A Journal of Caribbean Arts and Letters, Vol. 3, No. 2 (Fall-Winter 2005)
"Dr. Merle Collins", Profiles, The University of the West Indies at Mona, Jamaica.

1950 births
Black British women writers
Grenadian women writers
Living people
University of the West Indies alumni
Georgetown University Graduate School of Arts and Sciences alumni
Alumni of the London School of Economics
Academics of the University of North London
University of Maryland, College Park faculty
Grenadian women poets
Grenadian women short story writers
20th-century poets
20th-century short story writers
20th-century novelists
20th-century women writers
21st-century poets
21st-century short story writers
21st-century women writers
Grenadian novelists
Women novelists